Maryborough West or West Maryborough is a barony in County Laois (formerly called Queen's County or County Leix), Ireland.

Etymology
Maryborough is the former name of the town of Portlaoise, established in 1548 and named after Queen Mary I; it was given its current name in 1929.

Geography
Maryborough West is located in west-central County Laois, with the River Nore flowing through its southern part. Lough Ballyfin is the only lake of any size.

History

Maryborough East and West were in the Middle Ages the land of the Cinel Crimthann, an Irish clan with the surname Ó Duibh (Duffy or O'Diff).

Maryborough was originally a single barony; it was divided into East and West before 1807.

List of settlements

Below is a list of settlements in Maryborough West barony:
Abbeyleix (northern part)
Ballyfin
Kilbricken (eastern part)
Mountrath
Shanahoe

References

Baronies of County Laois